María Inés García (born 28 February 1964) is a Colombian dressage rider. She competed at the 2014 World Equestrian Games in Normandy, France where she finished 96th in the field of 100 competitors in the individual dressage competition.

She won a bronze medal in team dressage at the 2011 Pan American Games and a gold medal in team dressage at the 2006 Central American and Caribbean Games.

References

1964 births
Living people
Colombian female equestrians
Colombian dressage riders
Pan American Games bronze medalists for Colombia
Pan American Games medalists in equestrian
Central American and Caribbean Games gold medalists for Colombia
Competitors at the 2006 Central American and Caribbean Games
Equestrians at the 2011 Pan American Games
Central American and Caribbean Games medalists in equestrian
Medalists at the 2011 Pan American Games
20th-century Colombian women
21st-century Colombian women